Stone Middle School can refer to:
 Stone Middle School (Florida)
 Stone Middle School (Fairfax County, Virginia)